The 2018 El Paso County Elections were held on November 6, 2018. The election includes Assessor, Clerk and Recorder, Commissioner - District 1, Commissioner - District 5, Coroner, Sheriff, Surveyor, and Treasurer.

All Candidates are from the Colorado Secretary of State Site.

All Primary Results and General Election Candidates from the El Paso County Election page.

Assessor

Republican Incumbent Assessor Steve Schleiker is running for re-election.

General Election Candidates
  Sue McKnight(D)
 Steve Schleiker (R), Incumbent Assessor

Republican Primary

Declared
 Steve Schliker - Incumbent Assessor

Results

Democratic Primary

Declared
 Sue McKnight

Results

Results

Clerk and Recorder

Republican Incumbent Clerk and Recorder Chuck Broerman is running for re-election.

General Election Candidates
 Elizabeth Wilkes (D)
 Chuck Broerman (R), Incumbent Clerk and Recorder

Republican Primary

Declared
 Chuck Broerman - Incumbent Clerk and Recorder

Results

Democratic Primary

Declared
 Johnathan Herrera
 Elizabeth Wilkes

Results

Results

County Commissioner District 1

Republican Incumbent Darryl Glenn is term limited and cannot run for another term. He is running for U.S. House Representative of Colorado District 5

General Election Candidates
 Frank DeLalla (D)
 Holly Williams (R)

Republican Primary

Republican Ballot
 Holly Williams
 Calandra Vargas

Results

Democratic Primary

Democrat Ballot
 Frank Delalla

Results

Results

County Commissioner District 5
Republican Incumbent Peggy Littleton is term limited and cannot run for another term.

RESULTS: Republican Cami Bremer was elected.

General Election Candidates
 Kari Frederick (D)
 Cami Bremer (R)

Republican Primary

Republican Ballot
 Vickie Tonkins
 Cami Bremer

Results

Democratic Primary

Democrat Ballot
 Kari Fredrick

Results

Results

Coroner
Republican Incumbent Robert Bux, M.D. is retiring.

RESULTS: Republican Dr. Leon Kelly was elected.

General Election Candidates
 Chauncey Frederick (D)
 Leon Kelly (R)

Republican Primary

Declared
 Leon Kelly, M.D. (Board Certified Forensic Pathologist and current Deputy Chief Medical Examiner)

Results

Democratic Primary

Declared
 Chauncey Fredrick

Results

Withdrawn
 Matthew Reid

Results

Sheriff
Republican Incumbent Bill Elder is running for re-election.

RESULTS:Republican Incumbent Bill Elder was re-elected.

General Election Candidates
 Grace A. Sweeney-Maurer (D)
 Bill Elder (R), Incumbent Sheriff

Republican Primary

Republican Ballot
 Bill Elder - Incumbent Sheriff
 Michael Angley

Results

Democratic Primary

Democrat Ballot
 Grace A. Sweeney-Maurer

Results

Results

Surveyor
Republican Incumbent Lawrence Burnett is term limited and cannot run for another term.

RESULTS: Republican Richard Mariotti was elected.

General Election Candidates
 Destarte Ashleigh Haun (D)
 Richard Mariotti (R)

Republican Primary

Declared
 Richard Mariotti

Results

Democratic Primary

Declared
 Destarte Ashleigh Haun

Results

Results

Treasurer
Republican Incumbent Mark Lowderman is running for re-election.

RESULTS: Republican Incumbent Mark Lowderman was re-elected to his seat.

General Election Candidates
 Julie Torres (D)
 Mark Lowderman (R)

Republican Primary

Declared
 Mark Lowderman (incumbent)

Results

Democratic Primary

Declared
 Julie Torres

Results

Results

References

El Paso County
El Paso County
El Paso County
El Paso County